Buka Buka Island (id:) is a small island in the Molucca Sea. Part of the Togian Islands, the island is administrated as part of Indonesia's province of Central Sulawesi, in the regency of Tojo Una-Una, district of Ampana-Tete, village of Tete B.

The island is home for various endemic protected species such as Coconut Crabs, Bear Cuscus, and has a well preserved reef.

Part of the island is occupied by a sustainable resort called Reconnect Island Resort.

Access 
Buka Buka Island is located 30 minutes away from the closest town of Ampana, and can be accessed by boat, usually provided by Reconnect, the local eco-resort operating on the island.

To get there, travelers need to board a local plane from Palu, which is a 45 minutes flight available every Monday and Friday morning.

Alternative routes consist in taking a car from: Poso (4h), Luwuk (5h) or Palu (8h).

Economy 
Traditionally, Buka Buka Island has been used by Bajau villagers to farm coconuts and produce copra, mostly relying on uncertain market price to make a living.

It's only recently that the island became popular as an eco-tourism destination, after French entrepreneur Thomas Despin started to work together with local government and villagers to develop a sustainable resort called Reconnect.

The project attracted both national and international coverage, and the island is now one of the main attraction in Central Sulawesi, both for local and international travellers.

References 

Islands of Sulawesi
Populated places in Indonesia